Roger Livesey (25 June 1906 – 4 February 1976) was a British stage and film actor.  He is most often remembered for the three Powell & Pressburger films in which he starred: The Life and Death of Colonel Blimp, I Know Where I'm Going! and A Matter of Life and Death. Tall and broad with a mop of chestnut hair, Livesey used his highly distinctive husky voice, gentle manner and athletic physique to create many notable roles in his theatre and film work.

Early life
Livesey was born in Barry, Wales. Although most articles about him indicated that his parents were Samuel Livesey and Mary Catherine (née Edwards), later research has shown that his father was actually Joseph Livesey.  The confusion may have arisen because his mother Mary married Samuel (Joseph's brother) after Joseph's death and the death of Samuel's wife, Mary's sister.  Samuel and Mary had a child of their own, Stella, who was both Roger's half sister and first cousin.  Roger Livesey was educated at Westminster City School, London. His two step-brothers (who were also his first cousins) were also actors.

Acting career

Livesey studied under Italia Conti. His first stage role was as the office boy in Loyalty at St. James's Theatre in 1917. He then appeared in a wide range of productions from Shakespeare to modern comedies. He played various roles in the West End from 1920 to 1926, toured the West Indies and South Africa, and then returned to join the Old Vic/Sadler's Wells company from September 1932 until May 1934. In 1936 he appeared in New York City in Wycherley's comedy The Country Wife. While in New York he married actress Ursula Jeans, whom he had known previously in England (Livesey's sister Maggie was already married to Ursula Jeans' brother Desmond).

At the outbreak of the Second World War Livesey and Jeans were among the first volunteers to entertain the troops. He then applied for flying duties in the Royal Air Force but due to his age was rejected. Instead he worked in an aircraft factory at Desford aerodrome near Leicester to "do his bit for the war effort".

Livesey was chosen by Michael Powell to play the lead in The Life and Death of Colonel Blimp (1943) after Powell was denied his original choice, Laurence Olivier (Winston Churchill had objected to the movie and the Fleet Air Arm refused to release Olivier, who had been a Hollywood movie star before returning to England to take a Navy commission). The movie was shown in New York and established Livesey's international reputation as a talented character actor. In 1945, he was the first choice for the male lead role in Brief Encounter, which in the end went to Trevor Howard.

He toured Australia from 1956 to 1958 playing Jimmy Broadbent in The Reluctant Debutante and continued playing many theatrical roles during his film career until 1969. One of his last roles was as the Duke of St Bungay in The Pallisers television series. His final television appearance was in the series Benjamin Franklin in 1975.

Death

Livesey died in Watford from colorectal cancer at the age of 69 on 4 February 1976. He shares a memorial plaque with his wife Ursula Jeans in the actors' church St Paul's in Covent Garden.

Livesey family
The Livesey family has a complicated structure. Brothers Joseph and Sam Livesey married the Edwards sisters. Sam married Margaret Ann in 1900 and Joseph married Mary Catherine in 1905. Sam and Margaret Ann had two sons, Jack (1901) and Barrie Livesey (1905). Joseph and Mary Catherine had two children, Roger (1906) and Maggie (1911).

After Joseph died in 1911 and Margaret Ann died in 1913, Sam married Mary Catherine in 1913. They then brought up the children as one large family, having another child of their own, Stella in 1915.

The family tree was further complicated when Roger Livesey married the actress Ursula Jeans whose brother Desmond Jeans was already married to Roger's sister Maggie.

Many of the family formed a touring company of actors, performing in regional theatres and from the back of an old wagon, one side of which could be dropped to form a stage. Because of their touring, they did not regard themselves as particularly Welsh, or English. They were just British because people happened to be born in the places where their mothers happened to be residing at the time.

Filmography

 The Four Feathers (1921) - Harry Faversham - child
 Where the Rainbow Ends (1921) - Cubby the Lion Cub (uncredited)
 Married Love (1923) - Henry Burrows
 East Lynne on the Western Front (1931) - Sandy
 A Cuckoo in the Nest (1933) - Alfred
 The Veteran of Waterloo (1933) - Sergeant MacDonald
 Blind Justice (1934) - Gilbert Jackson
 Lorna Doone (1934) - Tom Faggus
 The Price of Wisdom (1935) - Peter North
 Midshipman Easy (1935) - Captain Wilson
 Rembrandt (1936) - Beggar Saul
 The Drum (1938) - Capt. Carruthers
 The Rebel Son (1938) - Peter Bulba
 Keep Smiling (1938) - Bert Wattle
 Spies of the Air (1940) - Charles Houghton
 The Girl in the News (1940) - Bill Mather
 The Life and Death of Colonel Blimp (1943) - Clive Candy
 I Know Where I'm Going! (1945) - Torquil MacNeil
 A Matter of Life and Death (1946) - Doctor Frank Reeves
 Vice Versa (1948) - Paul Bultitude / Dick Bultitude
 That Dangerous Age (1949) - Sir Brian Brooke
 Green Grow the Rushes (1951) - Capt. Cedric Biddle
 The Master of Ballantrae (1953) - Col. Francis Burke
 The Intimate Stranger (1956) - Ben Case
 The Stowaway (1958) - Major Owens
 It Happened in Broad Daylight (1958) - Professor Manz (English version, voice)
 The League of Gentlemen (1960) - Mycroft
 Upgreen - And at Em (1960)
 The Entertainer (1960) - Billy Rice
 By Invitation Only (1961, TV Movie) - Phillip Gordon-Davies
 No My Darling Daughter (1961) - General Henry Barclay
 Of Human Bondage (1964) - Thorpe Athelny
 The Amorous Adventures of Moll Flanders (1965) - Drunken Parson
 Oedipus the King (1968) - Shepherd
 Hamlet (1969) - First Player / Gravedigger
 Futtocks End (1970) - The Artist
 Justice (1971) - To Help an Old School Friend - Uncle George
 The Pallisers (1974, BBC serial) - Duke of St Bungay

Vocal Work

In 1958, he, Judith Furse, Terry-Thomas, Rita Webb, Avril Angers, and Miles Malleson, recorded 'Indian Summer of an Uncle', and 'Jeeves Takes Charge' for the Caedmon Audio record label, (Caedmon Audio TC-1137). It was re-released in stereo in 1964.

References

External links
 
 
 
  Performances in the University of Bristol Theatre Archive
 Collection of biography & reviews of Livesey
 From the Powell & Pressburger pages - dynasty of Roger Livesey
 other biographical notes from the same source
 Pages on Roger Livesey from Celebri
 BBC Wales Arts page. Top 10 Welsh actors: Roger Livesey
 Blockbuster page on Roger Livesey films
  (archive)

1906 births
1976 deaths
Deaths from cancer in England
Deaths from colorectal cancer
British male stage actors
British male film actors
English male television actors
People from Barry, Vale of Glamorgan
20th-century British male actors
People educated at Westminster City School